The Third Peacock Ministry was the 42nd ministry of the Government of Victoria. It was led by the Premier of Victoria, Alexander Peacock, and consisted of members of the Nationalist Party. The ministry was sworn in on 28 April 1924.

References 

Victoria (Australia) ministries
Ministries of George V
Cabinets established in 1924
Cabinets disestablished in 1924
1924 establishments in Australia
1924 disestablishments in Australia